North Harbour, St. Mary's Bay, Newfoundland (not to be confused with North Harbour, Placentia Bay, Newfoundland and Labrador) is a fishing community located on both sides of a long, narrow inlet of the same name. While the harbour is open to southwest winds, it is clear of dangers beyond its shores, and is sheltered enough to have been a refuge for many vessels in the past. It was probably settled in the late 18th  or early 19th century by the Powers family. North Harbour was adjacent to excellent cod fishing grounds. This community is also near good hunting grounds and several salmon rivers.

However, the fertile soil was the main reason for its settlement. In the 19th century, North Harbour had more farmers than fishermen. In the 20th Century, however, fishermen came to dominate the workforce. By 1992, most people went to work in other places. People worked in St. Joseph's and Admiral's Beach fish plants or commuted to St. John's.

North Harbour's own school closed around 1970; after this, the community's children went on a bus to school in Mount Carmel, Newfoundland. The community is overwhelmingly Roman Catholic, and has its own church, Sacred Heart, but after the 1980s it was forced to share a priest with the parish of St. Joseph's.

North Harbour is located in St. Mary's Bay, approximately 106 km from St. John’s. According to the 2001 Census, the population then was 290 people.

See also
St. Mary's Bay
Outport
Newfoundland Irish

Populated places in Newfoundland and Labrador